{{Speciesbox
| image = Aethionema armenum.jpg
| genus = Aethionema
| species = armenum
| authority = Boiss.
| synonyms = *Aethionema polygaloides Ledeb.
Aethionema pseudarmenum Stapf & Sprague
Aethionema recurvum Hausskn. & Bornm.
| synonyms_ref = <ref>[http://www.theplantlist.org/tpl1.1/record/kew-2624651 The Plant List, Aethionema armenum Boiss." ]</ref>
}}Aethionema armenum, also called rock cress, stonecress, or Persian candytuft, is a low-growing evergreen shrub in the Brassicaceae family native to the Mediterranean. There, it is typically found on rocky slopes above 800 meters.

 Description Aethionema armenum produces blue-green linear leaves less than an inch long. The plant, which consists of sprawling stems that are woody at the base and herbaceous at the tips, typically reaches about 4 inches tall and 8 or more inches across. The flowers, which appear in mid-spring to early summer, are typically white or pink and 6 millimeters or more across. 

 Cultivation Aethionema armenum'' does best in full sun and neutral to alkaline soil. In the US, it is suitable to be grown outside in hardiness zones 5–7. 'Warley Rose' is a common cultivar which has won the Royal Horticultural Society's Award of Garden Merit. It is susceptible to aphids and red spider mites.

References 

armenum
Plants described in 1842